DeGoy Bowman Ellis (November 27, 1876–19 January 19, 1949) was an American lawyer and politician.

Ellis was born on a farm in Boone County, Illinois. He received his bachelor's degree from Dixon College in 1897 and his law degree from University of Illinois College of Law in 1899. Ellis was admitted to the Illinois bar in 1899 and practiced law in Elgin, Illinois. He served as the Elgin city attorney and was a Republican. Ellis served in the Illinois House of Representatives from 1915 to 1921. He died in a hospital following a long illness.

Notes

External links

1876 births
1949 deaths
People from Boone County, Illinois
People from Elgin, Illinois
University of Illinois College of Law alumni
Illinois lawyers
Republican Party members of the Illinois House of Representatives